The 2012 AFF Championship qualification tournament was the qualification process for the 2012 AFF Championship, the ninth edition of the ASEAN Football Championship. It was held in Yangon, Myanmar from 5 to 13 October 2012, and involved the five lower ranked teams in Southeast Asia. The format was a single  round-robin tournament with the top two teams qualifying for the tournament proper.

Brunei made a comeback, after being re-instated towards the end of May 2011 by FIFA, following their suspension since September 2009. While the Philippines were one of the six seeded teams and gained direct entry to the main tournament, after reaching the semi-finals for the first time in the 2010 edition. They replaced Myanmar, who finished bottom of their group in 2010 and will be entering the qualification phase for the first time since 1998.

Venue

Fixtures
All times listed are local (UTC+6:30).

Goal scorers
3 goals

  Kyi Lin
  Adelino Trindade
  Alan Leandro
  Murilo de Almeida

2 goals
  Visay Phaphouvanin

1 goal

  Adi Said
  Md Aminuddin Zakwan Tahir
  Azwan Salleh
  Mohammad Helmi Zambin
  Muhammad Azwan Ali Rahman
  Rosmin Muhammad Kamis
  Khim Borey
  Prak Mony Udom
  Keo Sokngon
  Kovanh Namthavixay
  Khampheng Sayavutthi
  Kanlaya Sysomvang
  Kaung Sithu
  Pyae Phyo Aung
  Yan Aung Win
  Jesse Pinto

References

2012 in Burmese football
Qual
AFF Championship qualification
2012
2012 in Cambodian football
2012 in Laotian football
2012 in Philippine football
AFF Championship qualification
2012 in Brunei football